Ouzioini is a village on the island of Grand Comoro in the Comoros. At the time of the 1991 census the village had a population of 1857.

References

Populated places in Grande Comore